Campanus is a lunar impact crater that is located on the southwestern edge of Mare Nubium. It was named after Italian astronomer Campanus of Novara. It forms a crater pair with Mercator just to the southeast. Along the southern rampart of Campanus is the small lunar mare named Palus Epidemiarum. To the southwest is the small crater Dunthorne.

The rim of Campanus is roughly circular, with an outward bulge along the western rim and an inward bulge to the north-northwest. The outer wall has not been significantly eroded, although it has a low saddle-point along the south. The interior floor has been resurfaced by basaltic-lava, leaving only a small central peak projecting above the surface. The floor has the same low albedo as the nearby mare, giving it a dark appearance. It is marked by a pair of tiny craterlets near the northeast and northwest interior walls. A slender rille crosses the crater floor from north to south, passing to the east of the central peak.

To the west of Campanus is the rille system named Rimae Hippalus. Another rille system lies to the south, designated Rimae Ramsden.

Satellite craters
By convention these features are identified on lunar maps by placing the letter on the side of the crater midpoint that is closest to Campanus.

References

 
 
 
 
 
 
 
 
 
 
 

Impact craters on the Moon